Johannes Cornelius Jacobus "Hans" Lötter (1875-1901) was a Boer commander who fought, and was executed by, the British during the Second Boer War. Along with Gideon Scheepers, Lötter was one of the most brutal guerrilla commandos in the Cape Colony.

Lötter entered the Cape Colony during the war along with Pieter Hendrik Kritzinger. Lötter's Boer Commando earned a reputation for being brutal and undisciplined. Like many Boer commandants, Lötter promulgated public decrees to the residents of the Cape Colony, warning of harsh retribution if they did not support the forces of the Boer Republics. A column led by Henry Jenner Scobell was tasked with tracking down Lötter's commando. They tracked the commando to Groenkloof, west of Cradock, and surprised them with a dawn attack. Sixty of Lötter's men became casualties and sixty, including Lötter, were captured.

He was taken to Graaff-Reinet for his trial, and charged with treason, murdering unarmed British scouts, flogging two Afrikaners who had brought him terms of surrender, destroying railway lines, and marauding. The trial was straightforward, because Lötter was a citizen of the British-controlled Cape Colony, and therefore a rebel. He was executed along with seven of his men.

References 

Boer military personnel of the Second Boer War
1875 births
1901 deaths
20th-century executions by South Africa